Bocking Windmill or Bocking Churchstreet Windmill is a grade I listed post mill at Bocking, Essex, England which has been restored.

History
The first mention of the mill was in an indenture dated 19 April 1721 where the lease of land that had been enclosed for the building of a windmill was sold to Joseph Nash, miller of Halstead for £11. The mill was marked on Warburton, Bland and Smyth's map dated c1724. The mill was conveyed to Joseph Nash Jr in April 1772, who promptly mortgaged the mill for £100. Thomas French, miller of Halstead, purchased the mill for £135 on the death of the mortgagee c1734. French sold the mill in 1774 to Bartholomew Brown, of Wethersfield for £170. In 1784 John Tabor loaned £100, with the mill as security. The mill was to be run by the Brown family for three generations, ending with John Brown who died in September 1829.

In 1830 the mill was taken down and removed from its original site "near The Bull" to its new site opposite the pub. The mill and pub were both in the occupation of John Brown the Younger. The mill at this time had one pair of French burr stones and a flour dresser. It is thought that the mill was modernised about this time. In 1842, millwright Robert Hunt installed a new "right up shaft" (upright shaft) at a cost of £5. In 1850, the mill was in the occupation of William Dixon. Later millers were Henry Playle, James Hicks and Henry Hawkins. The mill was working until the First World War. the mill worked commercially until around 1924 and to order for a few years after that.

In 1929, the mill was presented to Bocking Parish Council by its owner, Edward H Tabor. With the help of the clerk, Alfred Hills, over £400 was subscribed and the mill was repaired at a cost of £225, with the rest of the money being invested to raise a maintenance fund of £5 annually. In the early 60s, the mill was derelict. Braintree and Bocking Urban District Council launched an appeal, and undertook to match pound-for-pound any money raise, with the aim of raising £2,500 in total. F J Bearman, a director of Tottenham Hotspur Football Club donated 50 Guineas. The mill was restored again in 1964 and officially reopened in November of that year. The Friends of Bocking Windmill was formed to ensure the mill's preservation.

Description

Bocking Windmill is a post mill with a two-storey roundhouse. It has two common sails and two spring sails carried on a wooden windshaft. Two pairs of millstones are located in the breast. The mill is winded by a tailpole.

Trestle and roundhouse
The trestle is of oak. The roundhouse is of brick, with a boarded roof covered in tarred felt. A pair of underdrift millstones is located on the upper floor of the roundhouse, these were driven via a portable steam engine in times of calm. The roundhouse was originally built as a single-storey structure, it and the mill being raised a storey at a later date.

Body
This was probably done after 1830, as a result of the doubling the number of millstones in the breast. The increased weight would have made the mill headsick.

Sails and windshaft
The windshaft is of cast iron, replacing a former wooden one. It was probably secondhand when fitted as it is longer than is really necessary. The mill has four double Patent sails. The mill would originally have been built with Common sails and a wooden windshaft.

Machinery
The brake wheel has been converted from compass arm construction to clasp arm construction, it is  diameter with 63 cogs. The mill was originally built with a single pair of millstones in the breast, but now has two pairs. The upright shaft is cast iron, and carries three wheels. There is a  cast iron mortice wheel with 66 cogs drives a flour dresser. The wallower is an iron mortice gear with 24 cogs, and the spur wheel is also an iron mortice gear, with 63 cogs. The stone nuts have 20 cogs each.

Millers
Joseph Nash 1721–1733
Joseph Nash Jr 1733
Thomas French c1738–1774
Bartholomew Brown 1774– 
 Brown
John Brown –1829
John Brown Jr 1829–1837
William Dixon 1850–1863
Henry Playle 1874
James Hicks 1890
Henry Hawkins 1912–1924
References for above:-

References

External links
Windmill World webpage on Bocking mill.
Friends of Bocking Windmill website.

Post mills in the United Kingdom
Grade I listed windmills
Windmills completed in 1830
Grade I listed buildings in Essex
Museums in Essex
Mill museums in England
Windmills in Essex
Braintree, Essex
1830 establishments in England